A hihi or stitchbird is a species of bird from the North Island of New Zealand.

Hihi, HiHi, Hi Hi, or Hi-Hi may also refer to:
 Hihi, New Zealand, a community in Northland, New Zealand, named after the bird
 "Hi Hi" (Puffy AmiYumi), a 2004 single by the Japanese pop rock duo Puffy AmiYumi
 Hi Hi Puffy AmiYumi, a Japanese-American animated television series
 Hi Hi Puffy AmiYumi (album), a 2004 compilation album
 Hi-Hi, a Japanese comedy duo

See also
 Hi Hi Hi (disambiguation)